The Willys F4-134 Hurricane was an inline-4 piston engine and powered the famous Jeep CJ in the CJ-3B, CJ-5, and CJ-6 models. It was also used in the Willys 473 and 475 pickups, wagons, and sedan deliveries. It replaced the Willys Go Devil engine that was used in the MB Jeep and other early Jeep-based models like the Jeepster. This engine was also built by Mitsubishi for their license-built Jeep, as well as other applications.

Design 
The Hurricane was based on the earlier Go-Devil flathead engine.  To get more power from the engine, the induction system was changed from the Go-Devil's side-valve configuration to an inlet-over-exhaust configuration, or "F-head". This allowed the valves to be larger and the combustion chamber to be smaller, improving flow and increasing the compression ratio. The compression ratio rose from 6.5:1 in the Go-Devil engine to 7.5:1 in the Hurricane engine, although a version of the Hurricane engine was made with a 6.9:1 compression ratio.

F134
The L134 Go Devil was updated with the F-head to become the F134 in 1950. Bore and stroke dimensions were the same as the L-head engine at " x " giving .

The F4-134 was introduced in 1950 in the Jeep Truck. Vehicles with this engine were given the model designation 4-73. This engine was not placed in a CJ until the introduction of the CJ-3B in 1953, which had a distinctive high hood to accommodate the much taller engine. The engine remained in production until 1971, after American Motors Corporation (AMC) purchased Kaiser Jeep.

Applications:
 1950–1961 Willys Jeep Truck
 1950–1961 Willys Jeep Wagon
 1950 Willys-Overland Jeepster
 1952–1971 Willys M38A1
 1953 Willys 475A Lark
 1953–1968 Willys CJ-3B
 1955–1971 CJ-5
 1956–1971 CJ-6
 1965-1967 DJ-5
 1966–1971 Jeepster Commando

F161
The F6-161 Hurricane is an F-head version of the L6-161 Lightning flathead straight six. It was used in the Model 685 Station Wagon.

BF-161
Its  displacement features a compression ratio of 7.6:1.

2600
The compression ratio remained 7.6:1.

3000
It also had a slightly higher compression ratio of 8:1. It initially used a different head with removable intake manifold. Later, after Ford acquired Willys-Overland do Brasil, they reverted the engine to its former head design with integral intake manifold, improved cooling between cylinders 5 and 6 and installed a side-mounted oil filter, instead of the front-mounted, hose connected arrangement used by Willys.

Applications:
 1961–1962 Willys Aero
 1963–1971 Willys Aero 2600
 1960-1974 Willys-Overland Jeep and Rural Willys
 1968–1971 Willys Itamaraty 3000
 1972-1974 Ford Maverick six-cylinder version in Brazil

Super Hurricane

Mitsubishi versions
Mitsubishi built a version of the Hurricane from 1954 as the JH4 (69 hp), mostly for use in their license-built version of the Jeep. They later developed a  overhead-valve diesel version of the same, called KE31. This was also turned into a 3.3 liter six-cylinder version with the same internal dimensions, producing , which was named KE36. These diesel engines were used in the Jeep, but also in a number of light to medium-weight trucks and buses.

References

Hurricane
Gasoline engines by model
Straight-four engines
Straight-six engines